Stratford International is a National Rail station in Stratford and a separate Docklands Light Railway (DLR) station nearby, located in East Village in London. Despite its name, no international services stop at the station; plans for it to be served by Eurostar trains never came to fruition. The National Rail platforms are, however, served by domestic Southeastern trains on the High Speed 1 route originating at St. Pancras, with interchange to Eurostar trains at other stops along the route.

Construction of the National Rail station was completed in 2006, but it only opened in 2009 to serve Southeastern services on HS1. In 2011 an extension of the DLR was opened to connect Stratford International to the wider London public transport network and to the main Stratford station to the south. The DLR station is physically separate and located just across the road from the HS1 station. Oyster cards and contactless payment cards are valid for travel to and from Stratford International, with the DLR station in Travelcard zone 2/3, but special fares apply at the HS1 station.

The four-platform HS1 station is built within "Stratford Box", a  concrete-sided cutting, meaning the station is located below ground level. It is located near the centre of the Queen Elizabeth Olympic Park, adjacent to the Westfield Stratford City shopping centre.

Background

As the station lies just inside the eastern boundary of the London Olympic Park, much of the surrounding land was little more than a construction site until mid-2012.

The tracks descend into a tunnel at both ends of the station as its platforms are closer to the surface than the tunnels; some of the platforms have a noticeable dip along their length at the east end. Stratford International has four platforms in the station box: two at the outer edges and two shorter ones forming a central island. The main line through tracks run down each side of the station between the adjacent platforms. There is a waiting room on the island platforms but not on the outer platforms.

 beyond the eastern portals, the tunnels pass just underneath the Central line tunnels curving north from Stratford.

The station was not authorised by the Channel Tunnel Rail Link Act 1996 and an order under the Transport and Works Act 1992 had to be made to allow for its construction. In the centre of the station is a single-track inclined viaduct, rising to the east end along and above the length of the island platforms. This is to allow out-of-service trains to leave the station box and reach the depot at Temple Mills.

Services and connections

National Rail
Southeastern operates all trains serving the High Speed 1 station. The full service started on 13 December 2009 using  EMUs.

The typical off-peak service in trains per hour is:
 3 tph to London St Pancras International
 1 tph to  via 
 1 tph to Ramsgate via 
 1 tph to  via 

Additional Southeastern services call at the station during the peak hours.

There are one or two international trains per hour in each direction that pass through without stopping.

During the 2012 Olympic Games, a service of eight trains an hour ran between St Pancras and Ebbsfleet, calling at Stratford, replacing the high speed service. Two of these would be extended to Ashford and one to Faversham. Between 11pm and 1am the service between St Pancras and Ebbsfleet would be increased to twelve per hour. To enable the domestic services to stop at platforms previously designed for Eurostar trains, the platforms had to be raised.

Docklands Light Railway

Its opening was originally planned for July 2010, but was delayed to 31 August 2011.

Bus services
London Bus routes 97, 108, 308, 339 and night route N205 serve the station.

International services
The original intended purpose of Stratford International station was to act as the London stop for regional Eurostar trains bypassing St Pancras and continuing to other destinations in Britain. However, these services did not come into being, and Rob Holden, chief executive of LCR and deputy chairman of Eurostar, stated that, "stopping a high-speed train seven minutes out of St Pancras is less than ideal", leaving only the domestic Southeastern trains serving the station. Critics derided the station as a white elephant.

By the time Southeastern was serving the station, the Transport Secretary Lord Adonis was urged by Sir Robin Wales, former Mayor of Newham, and Peter Miller, Westfield Stratford City's CEO, to order Eurostar to stop at the station. John Burton, development director of Westfield's Stratford City mall, said domestic services were a "poor substitute" for Eurostar: "International commuters are essential in order to realise the vision of a major metropolitan centre for east London. Direct international services will be a key part of the legacy of the Olympics."

Miller and local politicians including former Mayor of London Ken Livingstone warned that international services would be vital for the success of the Stratford City scheme and the regeneration of East London. London Assembly member Andrew Boff has suggested that rail operators considering running international trains should be forced to stop at Stratford International as part of their High Speed 1 line access. Eurostar did not agree to stop at the station during the 2012 London Olympics.

There are several other potential operators that may use the station for international services including Deutsche Bahn's London-Frankfurt service which was proposed in 2010, however was then abandoned.

Access and interchange

Access to the station was, at design stage, to be via a new link road to Waterden Road, which linked in turn to the A12 at Lea Interchange and south to Carpenters Road. This link road was constructed and a new signal junction installed on Waterden Road but never opened. However, these roads were stopped up in mid-2007 to enable the construction of the Olympic Park.

When opened it was located adjacent to the construction sites of both the London Olympic Park and Westfield Stratford City shopping centre which prevented pedestrian access; during local redevelopment work a temporary bus service linked Stratford International to nearby Stratford. The DLR station opened on 31 August 2011, and Westfield Stratford City on 13 September 2011. The bus service ran until 20 September.

References

External links

Docklands Light Railway stations in the London Borough of Newham
Railway stations in the London Borough of Newham
Railway stations opened by Network Rail
Railway stations in Great Britain opened in 2009
Railway stations served by Southeastern
Queen Elizabeth Olympic Park
Stratford, London